Le avventure di Giacomo Casanova (a.k.a. The Sins of Casanova) is a 1955 Italian  comedy film directed by Steno. It stars Gabriele Ferzetti, Corinne Calvet and Irène Galter. Famed horror film director Lucio Fulci wrote the script, one of his earliest projects. Mario Bava was the cinematographer.

Cast
Gabriele Ferzetti as Giacomo Casanova
Corinne Calvet as Louse de Châtillon
Irène Galter as Dolores
Nadia Gray as Teresa
Mara Lane as Barbara
Marina Vlady as La mariée
Carlo Campanini as Le valet
Aroldo Tieri as José
Anna Amendola as Gertrude
Florence Arnaud as Angelica
Fulvia Franco as Bettina
Lia Di Leo as Lucrezia
Nico Pepe as Bragadin
Nerio Bernardi as L'inquisiteur
Ursula Andress as Passeggera della carrozza

References

External links

 

1955 films
1950s Italian-language films
1955 comedy films
Films directed by Stefano Vanzina
Films about Giacomo Casanova
Films set in the 18th century
Films shot in Italy
Films set in Italy
Italian comedy films
1950s Italian films